Trnovski Vrh is a settlement in the Slovene Hills in the Municipality of Trnovska Vas in northeastern Slovenia. The area is part of the traditional region of Styria. It is now included in the Drava Statistical Region.

A small chapel-shrine with a wooden belfry in settlement dates to the late 19th century.

References

External links
Trnovski Vrh at Geopedia

Populated places in the Municipality of Trnovska vas